Donald or Don Holmes may refer to:

Donald F. Holmes  (1910–1980), American inventor
Donald Grahame Holmes, Australian electrical engineer
Donald Don Holmes (born 1959), Australian rules football player
Donald Don Holmes (American football) (born 1961), American former National Football League player and college coach